Élodie Bouchez-Bangalter (born 5 April 1973) is a French actress. She became internationally known for her role as Renée Rienne on the fifth and final season of the television show Alias and for playing Maïté Alvarez in the film Wild Reeds.

Early life and career
Bouchez was born in Montreuil-sous-Bois, Seine-Saint-Denis, Île-de-France, France. She is best known for her César Award's Most Promising Actress winning film Wild Reeds (1994) by André Téchiné, and the Best Actress Award for the film La Vie rêvée des anges at the 1998 Cannes Film Festival. She also won the Best Actress award for Poetical Refugee (original French title La faute à Voltaire) at the Cologne Mediterranean Film Festival-2001.

In the fall of 2005, she joined the cast of the American TV series Alias for its fifth and final season. She played Renée Rienne, an assassin who works unofficially for a black ops division of the CIA. Although considered a main cast member, she only appeared in select episodes, her character acting as something of a "secret weapon". Bouchez has also guest starred on Showtime's lesbian drama series The L Word, where she portrays Claude, a French writer who meets Jenny on a trip to Canada.

Personal life
Bouchez is married to Thomas Bangalter of the former electronic music duo Daft Punk. The couple have two sons.

Filmography

References

External links

French site

Living people
European Film Award for Best Actress winners
Best Actress Lumières Award winners
People from Montreuil, Seine-Saint-Denis
French film actresses
French expatriate actresses in the United States
French television actresses
20th-century French actresses
21st-century French actresses
Actresses from Paris
Cannes Film Festival Award for Best Actress winners
Best Actress César Award winners
Most Promising Actress César Award winners
1973 births